Olpuch-Dworzec  is a settlement in the administrative district of Gmina Stara Kiszewa, Kościerzyna County, Pomeranian Voivodeship, in northern Poland.

History 
For details of the history of the region, see History of Pomerania.

References

Olpuch-Dworzec